Government Property Agency refers to:

Government Property Agency (Hong Kong)
Government Property Agency (United Kingdom)